Alexa Ann McDonough  ( Shaw; August 11, 1944 – January 15, 2022) was a Canadian politician who became the first woman to lead a major, recognized political party in Nova Scotia, when she was elected the Nova Scotia New Democratic Party's (NSNDP) leader in 1980.

McDonough served as a member of the Nova Scotia Legislature from 1981 to 1994, representing the Halifax Chebucto and Halifax Fairview electoral districts. She stepped down as the NSNDP's leader and as a member of the legislature in 1994. She subsequently ran for, and was elected, leader of the federal New Democratic Party (NDP) in 1995. McDonough was elected the Member of Parliament (MP) for the federal electoral district of Halifax in 1997. She stepped down as party leader in 2003, but continued to serve as an MP for two more terms, until 2008, when she retired from politics altogether. In 2009, she became the interim president of Mount Saint Vincent University and was appointed an Officer of the Order of Canada in December of that year.

Early life and education
McDonough was born Alexa Ann Shaw in Ottawa, Ontario, on August 11, 1944, at the Ottawa Civic Hospital. Her parents were Jean MacKinnon and Lloyd Robert Shaw, a wealthy businessman who was committed to progressive politics. He served as the first research director for the federal NDP's predecessor, the national Co-operative Commonwealth Federation (CCF), and was an early financial backer of the NDP when it formed in 1961.

McDonough was involved in social activism from an early age, when, at 14, she led her church youth group in publicizing the conditions of Africville, a low-income, predominantly Black neighbourhood in Halifax. She attended Queen's University in Kingston, Ontario, which was her family's alma mater. After two-years, she transferred to Dalhousie University in Halifax, where she completed a Bachelor of Arts degree in sociology and psychology in 1965. She became a social worker and, during the 1970 Nova Scotia general election, worked for Gerald Regan's Liberal Party, writing that party's social policy platform. She quickly became disenchanted with Regan and the Liberals, and joined the New Democratic Party in 1974.

Provincial leadership
McDonough's first foray into electoral politics occurred during the 1979 and 1980 federal elections. In both of those elections, she ran unsuccessfully in the federal riding of Halifax.  In the 1980 federal election, she lost to former Nova Scotia premier Gerald Regan, the same politician that she once supported back in 1970.

Just after the 1980 federal election, in the spring, Jeremy Akerman stepped down as the Nova Scotia NDP's leader. At this time, there was a growing rift between the Cape Breton Island and Mainland wings of the party. This rift exploded in June, when Paul MacEwan, the NDP MLA for Cape Breton Nova, was expelled from the party due to his constant public airing of internal party disputes, including the implication that Akerman resigned due to "Trotskyist elements" from the mostly mainland-based provincial council. To make this situation worse for an incoming leader, the NDP's four MLAs, all from Cape Breton constituencies, voted 3–1 to keep him in the caucus, with Len J. Arsenault – the MLA for Cape Breton North – being the only negative vote. MacEwan's expulsion became one of the dominant issues during the leadership race that fall.

In late September, Akerman was appointed to a top Nova Scotia civil service job that required him to both resign from the Legislature and terminate his membership in the NDP. James 'Buddy' MacEachern, a leadership candidate, and MLA  for Cape Breton Centre, was made the interim leader on October 2.

Despite these internecine battles, and not having a seat in the Nova Scotia House of Assembly, McDonough decided to enter the leadership race.  The other candidate in the race to replace Akerman was Arsenault. The leadership convention was convened in Halifax, with the leadership vote held on November 16, 1980. McDonough received 237 votes, compared to Arsenault's 42 votes, and MacEachern's 41 votes, giving her a first ballot landslide victory. As a result of her victory, she became the first woman in Canada to lead a major recognized political party.

McDonough's first order of business was to settle the Paul MacEwan question. On December 9, 1980, she managed to get her former leadership rivals to vote MacEwan out of the caucus and party. Since she did not have a seat in the Nova Scotia House of Assembly, the party was left with just two seats, because MacEwan was now an independent, and Akerman's seat was left vacant due to his resignation. For almost a year,  she would sit in the Assembly's visitors gallery until she could run for a seat in the 1981 Nova Scotia general election. McDonough's first provincial  election as leader was fought in the Halifax Chebucto riding, where the Liberals and Conservatives were more or less evenly matched in terms of voter support, and the NDP was a distant third in the previous election.  McDonough won her seat, the first one for the NDP in Mainland Nova Scotia, but the NDP lost all of its Cape Breton Island seats in the process. She spent the next three years as the only New Democrat, and the only woman in the House of Assembly. She took on the "old boys' network", that permeated Nova Scotia's politics at the time, by attempting to dismantle the province's entrenched patronage system.

McDonough was personally popular throughout Nova Scotia, consistently being the voters' top choice in leadership polls, but her popularity did not rub off on the party. She led the party through three more elections, eventually building the caucus up to three members: all from the mainland, including future Nova Scotia NDP leader, Robert Chisholm. After fourteen years as the Nova Scotia NDP leader, which at the time made her the longest-serving leader of a major political party, she stepped down on November 19, 1994. John Holm, the NDP's Sackville-Cobequid MLA, took over as interim leader, until Chisholm was elected leader in 1996.

Federal leadership
As the fortunes of the Nova Scotia NDP were slowly rising during the mid-1990s, the same could not be said of its federal counterpart. The 1993 Canadian federal election was an unmitigated disaster for the NDP. Under Audrey McLaughlin's leadership, the party suffered its worst defeat since the late 1950s, in terms of seats, when it was then called the CCF. When looking at the popular vote, it was the worst ever election for a federal social-democratic party in the 20th century, with just seven percent of the vote.  The party only had nine seats, three short of the twelve seats needed to have official party status in the House of Commons, and all the extra funding, research, office space and Question Period privileges it accords.

In the aftermath of the 1993 election, the party set about reforming its policies and purpose, with McLaughlin announcing on April 18, 1994, that she would step down as leader by 1996. McLaughlin, faced with internal squabbles similar to those that occurred in the Nova Scotia party back in 1980, advanced her departure from the end of 1996 to the end of 1995. With an internal party atmosphere that could best be described as toxic,  McDonough entered the leadership race in the spring of 1995. The conditions were similar to the ones she faced during her first leadership campaign in 1980: a divided party that was self-immolating.  However, the party was also hobbled by unpopular provincial NDP governments in Ontario and British Columbia.  Indeed, the NDP had suffered particularly severe losses in those two provinces at the federal level in 1993, losing all of its Ontario MPs, and all but two of its British Columbia MPs, more than half of its caucus.

Prior to the NDP leadership convention on October 14, 1995, McDonough was widely viewed as an also-ran behind the leading contenders, Svend Robinson and Lorne Nystrom, but at the convention she placed second on the first ballot, ahead of Nystrom in what was almost a three-way split. Although Robinson had placed first on that ballot, he felt that most of Nystrom's supporters would go to McDonough on the second ballot, giving her the victory. Thus, he conceded to McDonough before a second ballot could be held. On a motion by Robinson, the convention formally acclaimed McDonough as the party's new leader. McDonough became the first person from Atlantic Canada to lead a major party since Robert Stanfield retired as the Progressive Conservatives' leader in 1976. Unusually for a major-party leader, she did not have one of her MPs in a safe seat resign so she could get into Parliament via a by-election, opting instead to make a third bid for her home riding of Halifax in the next general election.

In the 1997 election, her first as leader, the party won 21 seats.  This included a historic breakthrough in the Atlantic provinces, a region where it had only won three seats in its entire history prior to 1997.  McDonough herself won Halifax by 11,000 votes, pushing Liberal incumbent Mary Clancy into third place.  She would continue to win it consecutively three more times until she retired from politics in 2008.

During the next few years, McDonough's leadership of the party elicited controversy. Union leaders were lukewarm in their support of her, often threatening to break away from the NDP, in particular the Canadian Auto Workers' president Buzz Hargrove. She was widely seen within the NDP as trying to pull the party toward the centre of the political spectrum, in the Third Way mode of Tony Blair although when she made her leader's speech at the party's August 1999 Ottawa policy convention, she attempted to distance herself from "Third Way" policies by stating: "We must lay out a new way for Canadians to navigate in the 21st century. Not an old way, not a 'third way', but a made-in-Canada way...." A vote on a resolution to adopt Third Way policies in the party's platform formally was defeated, as many union leaders opposed it and McDonough's "Canadian Way".

The Canadian Alliance and its new leader, Stockwell Day, presented a further challenge to McDonough's NDP. Fearful of the prospect of an Alliance government, many NDP supporters moved to the Liberals. As well, two NDP MPs, Angela Vautour and Rick Laliberte, crossed the floor to other party caucuses, reducing the NDP caucus to 19 seats. In the 2000 federal election, the NDP was held to just 13 seats, and its 8.5 percent of the popular vote, was near its historic low from the 1993 campaign. About the only solace the NDP and McDonough could take from the 2000 campaign was that they kept official party status in the House of Commons (if only barely), unlike McLaughlin in the 1993 campaign.

After the disappointing performance in the 2000 federal election, there were more calls for party renewal. Some party activists perceived that the NDP had moved to the centre of the political spectrum and wanted to change that by bringing in social/political activists outside of the parliamentary process. They called their movement the New Politics Initiative, or NPI. Another group, called NDProgress, wanted to reform the party's internal structures, with procedural changes to how leaders were elected and limiting how much control Labour Unions had in the party.  The NPI proposal to create a new party from the ashes of the NDP, was opposed by McDonough, and by former NDP leader, Ed Broadbent. The NPI resolution was voted down when it was presented at the party's November 2001 Winnipeg policy convention. NDProgress's resolution to have a "one member one vote" election for party leader, with a provision to limit organized labour's allotment of ballots to a maximum of 25 percent, passed. The 2001 Winnipeg convention was also where McDonough easily defeated a leadership challenge by Socialist Caucus member Marcel Hatch, who was also an NPI supporter.

The issue that highlighted McDonough's federal leadership, occurred during the twilight of her career: the fight against Islamophobia and general anti-Arab sentiment, which swept through Canada and the United States in the wake of the 9/11 attacks in September 2001. She led the charge on the national scene to repatriate Mahar Arar, an Arab-Canadian who was wrongly detained as a terrorist by United States border officials, on an erroneous tip from Canada's secret service. Throughout 2002 and 2003, McDonough campaigned for his release. When he was released, his wife, Monia Mazigh, joined the NDP and became a candidate for them in the 2004 federal election, out of recognition for the support McDonough and the party showed for her and her husband.

With Brian Masse's May 2002 by-election victory, in the Windsor West riding, the party's caucus grew to 14 members.  A few weeks later, on June 5, 2002, McDonough used this positive turn in electoral fortunes to announce that she was stepping down as NDP leader.  On January 25, 2003, at the Toronto leadership convention, she was succeeded by Jack Layton.  She was re-elected to Parliament in the 2004 federal election and again in 2006.  In the NDP's shadow cabinet, McDonough served as the critic for International Development, International Cooperation and Peace Advocacy.

Retirement
On June 2, 2008, McDonough announced that she would not run again in the riding of Halifax in the next federal election. She made the announcement at the Lord Nelson Hotel, the same place where she celebrated her 1997 victory as the MP for Halifax. McDonough said that she would continue on as the MP for Halifax until the next federal election.

On June 29, 2009, it was announced that McDonough was named the new interim president of Mount Saint Vincent University, in Halifax, Nova Scotia. Her one-year appointment began in August 2009. It was announced on December 30, 2009, that she was to be appointed an officer of the Order of Canada for her pioneering work as both the Nova Scotia and Federal leader of the New Democratic Party. She received an honorary  Doctor of Civil Laws degree from Acadia University, in Wolfville, Nova Scotia on May 13, 2012.

Personal life and death
McDonough's first marriage was in 1966 to Halifax lawyer, Peter McDonough (April 1, 1940 – November 17, 2021), with whom she had two sons: Justin and Travis. In 1993, she separated from McDonough, later divorcing him; she said her political career did not play a part in it. In 1994, just before she stepped down as Nova Scotia leader, she had a hysterectomy, and waited until she recuperated before she announced her resignation. During her time as leader of the federal NDP, McDonough was romantically involved with David MacDonald, a former Progressive Conservative (PC) MP for Toronto Centre—Rosedale and a cabinet minister. MacDonald ran as the NDP candidate in Toronto Centre—Rosedale in the 1997 election; in the previous election, he was the PC incumbent, and like every other PC candidate in Ontario in 1993, was defeated. The pair split up prior to the 2004 federal election.

On May 3, 2013, McDonough announced that she had been diagnosed with breast cancer about four months earlier during a mammogram. She had been receiving treatment.

McDonough died at a long-term care home in Halifax, on January 15, 2022, at the age of 77. She suffered from Alzheimer's disease in the seven years prior to her death.

Electoral record 

Source:

Source:

Source:

Source:

Source:

Source:

References
Specific

Bibliography

External links

1944 births
2022 deaths
20th-century Canadian politicians
20th-century Canadian women politicians
21st-century Canadian politicians
21st-century Canadian women politicians
Canadian Baptists
Canadian activists
Canadian university and college chief executives
Canadian women activists
Dalhousie University alumni
Deaths from Alzheimer's disease
Female Canadian political party leaders
Leaders of the Nova Scotia CCF/NDP
Members of the House of Commons of Canada from Nova Scotia
Members of the Order of Nova Scotia
Mount Saint Vincent University
NDP and CCF leaders
Deaths from dementia in Canada
New Democratic Party MPs
Nova Scotia New Democratic Party MLAs
Officers of the Order of Canada
Politicians from Ottawa
Women MLAs in Nova Scotia
Women members of the House of Commons of Canada